Niobe may refer to:

Greek mythology
Niobe, daughter of Tantalus and Dione
 Niobe, rival of Aedon, possibly identified with either of the other two Niobes: the daughter of Tantalus or the daughter of Phoroneus
 Niobe (daughter of Phoroneus)

Arts and entertainment
Niobe, a lost play by Aeschylus
Niobe, regina di Tebe, a 1688 opera by Agostino Steffani (1653–1728)
Niobe, an 1826 opera seria by composer Giovanni Pacini (1796-1867)
The Destruction of the Children of Niobe (c. 1759–1760), a painting by Richard Wilson
Niobe room, a room in the Uffizi Gallery, Florence, Italy
Tearless Niobe, one of the "Olga Poems" by Denise Levertov
Niobe (film), American silent film by Edwin S. Porter
Niobe (play) 1892 farce by Harry Paulton

Niobe, German electronic musician who has provided vocals for artists such as Mouse On Mars
Deep Niobe, a fictional character in the manga series Saint Seiya
"Niobe", a song by Caribou from Andorra (album)
Niobe Kaftan, a character in Piers Anthony's Incarnations of Immortality series
Niobe (The Matrix), a character in the film The Matrix Reloaded
Niobe Vorena, a character in the television series Rome

Science and technology
71 Niobe, an asteroid
Moss-forest rat (Rattus niobe), a species of rodent in the family Muridae
Niobe fritillary (Argynnis niobe), a butterfly of the family Nymphalidae
Niobe ground squirrel (Lariscus niobe), a species of rodent in the family Sciuridae
Niobe's shrew (Crocidura niobe), a species of mammal in the family Soricidae
Orachrysops niobe, a species of butterfly in the family Lycaenidae
Niobe (trilobite), a genus of trilobites

Ships
, four ships of the Royal Navy
, a Diadem-class protected cruiser transferred to the Royal Canadian Navy
German anti-aircraft cruiser Niobe, a German World War II vessel
SMS Niobe a German Gazelle-class light cruiser of  World War I
Niobe (schooner) (1922–1932), a tall ship used by the German Navy to train cadets and aspiring NCOs
, a passenger ferry in service 1995-2000

See also
Niobium, an element